= Evangelical right =

Evangelical right may refer to:

- The right to preach a religion and to win converts (Freedom of religion § Right to proselytize)
- The Christian right in a political sense
